Maerua elegans is a species of plant in the Capparaceae family. It is endemic to the Democratic Republic of the Congo.  It is threatened by habitat loss.

References

elegans
Endemic flora of the Democratic Republic of the Congo
Vulnerable plants
Taxonomy articles created by Polbot